The Chongqing Rail Transit (branded as CRT; also known as Chongqing Metro) is the rapid transit system in the city of Chongqing, China. In operation since 2005, it serves the transportation needs of the city's main business and entertainment downtown areas and inner suburbs. Lines 1, 4, 5, 6, 9, 10, the Loop line and Jiangtiao line are conventional heavy-rail metro lines, Lines 2 and 3 are high-capacity monorails. To keep up with urban growth, construction is under way on Line 18 and several other lines, in addition to extensions to Lines 5, 6 and 10.

The Chongqing Rail Transit is a unique transit system in China because of the geography of Chongqing being a densely-populated but mountainous city, with multiple river valleys. Two lines use heavy-monorail technology, leveraging the ability to negotiate steep grades and tight curves and rapid transit capacity. They are capable of transporting 32,000 passengers per hour per direction. However the busiest section of Line 3 reaches a peak passenger volume of 37,700 pphpd in 2019. At , the system's two monorail lines form the longest monorail system in the world, with the  Line 3 being the world's longest single monorail line even if the  Konggang branch is excluded. The length and the capacity of its monorail network both also make it the world's busiest monorail system, with a total of 94 million and 250 million rides in 2015 on Line 2 and Line 3, respectively. The latter ridership statistic for Line 3 also makes it the world's busiest single monorail line.

The extreme difference in elevation between the river valleys and the hilly plateaus of Chongqing pose a unique challenge in designing alignments for conventional rail transit lines. Additionally, Hualongqiao station is a six story structure that has Line 10 trains stopping 48 meters above the surface, making it the tallest metro station in the world, surpassing Smith–Ninth Streets station in New York.

The Chongqing Rail Transit system processes a number of extremely-long metro-only bridges. Additionally, Chongqing Rail Transit system has numerous double-deck bridges carrying vehicle and metro traffic, such as the Chaotianmen Bridge, which is the world's longest arch bridge.

Network

Loop line

The Loop line (coded as "Line 0") is a rapid transit loop line. The northeastern section was opened on 28 December 2018. The southern section with the Egongyan Rail Transit Bridge opened on 30 December 2019. Three major railway stations in Chongqing are also linked by this line: Chongqing North railway station, Shapingba railway station, and Chongqing West railway station. Loop Line's color is yellow.

Line 1

It is the first heavy-rail subway line in Chongqing and the second in Western China. The passenger capacity is 36,000 passengers per hour in each way. The line serves as the system's backbone connecting the densest areas including the main Central Business Districts of Jiefangbei, Lianglukou, Daping, and Shapingba. It is the first conventional subway, running in a deep-bored tunnel below Yuzhong and Shapingba Districts.

Line 1 has transfer interchange stations with Line 6 at Xiaoshizi and Line 2 at Jiaochangkou in Jiefangbei CBD and at Daping and Line 3 at Lianglukou,  which is near Chongqing railway station in central Yuzhong. Line 1 is also transferable with the Loop Line at Shapingba, although out-of-station transfer is currently needed due to construction setbacks on the interchange channel and concourse connecting the two subway lines.

In 1992, the Chongqing government signed a Build-Operate-Transfer agreement with a Hong Kong company and provided the land for the project, but work ceased in 1997 because of legal issues. Work resumed from Chaotianmen to Shapingba on 9 June 2009, and a limited opening occurred on 28 July 2011. Thales provided an operations control centre for the line. Line 1's color is red.

Line 2

Line 2, a monorail line, runs  and has 25 stations. It begins as a subway under downtown Jiefangbei, then runs west along the southern bank of Jialing River on an elevated line, and then turns south into the southwestern inner suburbs, looping back east, to terminate at Yudong, in Ba'nan District. It runs mostly elevated, but a  section is underground, including three of its 18 stations in the Jiefangbei CBD and central Daping areas in the extremely-dense area of Yuzhong District. Line 2 runs through four administrative districts in the central city (Yuzhong, Jiulongpo, Dadukou, and Ba'nan). In 2010, Line 2 served 45 million passengers. It also runs through Daping CBD, Yangjiaping CBD in Jiulongpo District, and Chongqing Zoo at. Most trains have four cars, and six-car trains began to operate in September 2012. Line 2 is the first rapid transit line to open in the Interior West of China, in 2005. In 2013, six-car trains are being implemented because of overcrowding and increasing demand. Line 2's color is green.

Line 3

Line 3 is the longest and busiest monorail in the world. It runs from north to south and links the districts separated by the Yangtze (Chang Jiang) and the Jialing Rivers. The initial segment, from Lianglukou to Yuanyang (18 stations), opened on 29 September 2011, with a northern extension, from Yuanyang to Jiangbei Airport, opening on 30 December 2011. A southern extension, from Ertang to Yudong, opened on 28 December 2012.

Most trains have six cars, more than on the older Line 2. The line started to equip eight-car trains in 2014, which are now in operation. Line 3's color is indigo.

Line 4

Line 4 is a rapid transit line. In June 2018, debugging of the first segment of Phase I commenced. The line began operating on 28 December that year. Line 4's color is orange.

Line 5 

Line 5 is a northeast–southwest heavy-rail line crossing the centre, and the line has opened its northern and southern sections of phase 1 and northern extension. It will connect Yubei, Jiangbei, Yuzhong, Jiulongpo, Shapingba and Dadukou districts. New six-car trains were introduced on the line. Line 5's color is light blue.

Line 6

Line 6 is the second heavy-rail subway line of Chongqing. Opened on 28 September 2012, it connects Nan'an, Yuzhong, Jiangbei and Yubei districts in central Chongqing.

Phase 1 of the Chayuan extension was opened in 2014. Thales provided an operations control centre for the line. Line 6's color is pink.

Line 9 

The first phase of Line 9 opened on 25 January 2022. Line 9's colour is crimson.

Line 10 

The line serves the North Railway station and the airport terminals. The first phase (Liyuchi to Wangjiazhuang) opened on 28 December 2017, and the second phase will connect Yuzhong and Nan'an districts by crossing the Jialing and the Yangtze rivers. Two new bridges, Zengjiayan Jialing River Bridge and Nanjimen Rail Transit Bridge, are under construction for train services to the south. Line 10's color is purple.

Jiangtiao line 

Jiangtiao line is a suburban rapid transit line connecting Jiangjin District with the metropolitan area. There will be through service between Line 5 and Jiangtiao line in the future. Jiangtiao line's color is blue.

Ticketing

Transport cards 
CRT accepts Life & Transport Card (Chongqing Universal Card, released by Chongqing City Card Payment Co., Ltd.) and its compatible cards, released by partner companies in other cities of China. There is a 10% discount applied to the Regular Card if it is used on public transit in the city. The higher price is paid for transfers between the bus and the metro within 1 hour (not including metro-to-metro, according to the paying time). The Regular Card can be purchased at any CRT station, and a deposit can be recovered when the card is returned with its receipt. In addition the card can be used in many shops, cinemas, restaurants, etc. in Chongqing. The Students' Card and the Elders' Card can not be directly used on the metro since their monthly fee covers only buses unless a cash sub-account, which allows a 50% discount, is added to the cards for free at the service points.

Time limit 
All trips must be completed in 3 hours upon entering the fare-paid area, or the highest ticket price in the system will be charged in addition.

Operation 
During times of heavy use like for major events, CRT may close some stations to avoid overcrowding. In 2018, CRT closed Xiaoshizi, Jiaochangkou, Qixinggang, Lianglukou, Xiaolongkan, and Shapingba stations of Line 1; Jiaochangkou and Linjiangmen stations of Line 2; Lianglukou, Huaxinjie, Guanyinqiao, and Hongqihegou stations of Line 3; Shangxinjie, Xiaoshizi, Grand Theater, Jiangbeicheng, and Hongqihegou stations of Line 6 after 20:00 on Christmas Eve, Christmas Day, after 19:00 on New Year's Eve. And they also closed Shapingba and Shangxinjie stations of Loop line after 19:00 on New Year's Eve.

From 9 to 12 November 2018, they closed Grand Theater and Jiangbeicheng stations from 10:00 to 15:00 because of heavy use during Flower Expo; from 1 to 7 November 2019, they closed Grand Theater and Jiangbeicheng stations since 10:00 till 16:00 because of heavy use during Flower Expo.

Accessibility 
Almost every station has accessible elevators and toilets, and almost every train has wheelchair locks. Only the oldest rolling stock and toilets of Line 2 are not fully accessible. In addition, many older interchange channels between lines are not designed with accessibility in mind, which means the disabled there must transfer via the main concourse.

Luggage rack 
The trains on Line 10, which links Jiangbei Airport and Chongqing North railway station, are equipped with a luggage rack on each car.

History 
The CRT is part of the central government's project to develop the Western regions. The Japan Bank for International Cooperation provided some of the funding. Construction was carried out, with co-operation between Changchun Railway Vehicles Co. Ltd. and Hitachi Monorail, which used advanced Japanese monorail technology. Construction on Line 2 began in 1999, and the line was officially opened in June 2005 from Jiaochangkou (Jiefangbei CBD) to Zoo (Chongqing Zoo).

Early concepts and attempts 

 1946 plan: The Nationalist government made a plan of high-speed tram system. The train was 8 m long, 1.8 m wide, with two 35-horsepower motors and a trailer. Each train took 240 passengers. The headway was designed to be 10 minutes. The system was expected to carry 1 million passengers per day. Some of the tracks were underground.
 Line A, Longmenhao – Ciqikou, 9 stations, 
 Line B, Longmenhao – Nanwenquan, 7 stations, 
 Line C, Longmenhao – Datiankan, 3 stations, 
 1958 attempt: "Yuzhong District Subway Engineering Unit" was started in late 1958, only to be suspended one year later.
 1960 plan: A  underground rapid rail transit system, linking the city center with Xinpaifang, Xiaolongkan, Yangjiaping, Shiqiaopu, Lianglukou, and other populated areas, was planned.
 1965 attempt: The unit was reinstated. It has 4 units, including more than 1000 workers in total. Construction was stopped again in late 1966 by the Cultural Revolution. The unit was officially disbanded again in 1971. The completed tunnel sections were taken over by the civil air defense authorities.
 1983 plan: A  subway line (Chaotianmen – Yangjiaping) was planned. It is the precursor to today's Line 2.
 1988 attempt: Some Hong Kong businessmen arrived to start a metro company in Lianglukou. The tunnel from previous attempts were extended.
 1991 plan: A 4-line  monorail system was planned.

Official long-term plans 

Line 4 in the previous blueprint received a huge update and was renamed to Loop line, according to its new shape.

Commencement and expansions

Incidents 
At around 14:00 of 8 January 2019, an improperly secured air defense lock was struck by an in service Loop line train, derailing it and causing serious damage to the cabcar. The accident injured three employees and one passenger. One of the employees, the driver, later died from their injuries shortly after being sent to the hospital.

Technology

Visual design 
Unlike most metro systems of other cities in China, CRT did not follow the design style of MTR Corporation in Hong Kong. The signage system was designed by GK Design Group in Japan, and the monorail lines are based on Hitachi Monorail technology. That gives the Chongqing Rail Transit a distinctive Japanese aesthetic, in contrast to other metro systems in China.

CRT also gave each line a theme about the local culture, and the stations on the line will have some art works in the theme.

Expansion 
CRT is expected to have 8 lines criss-crossing the urban districts by 2020 and a loop line connecting the commercial areas in the urban area. The other 9 lines are expected to be in operation by 2050.

Phase 2 & 3 projects

Phase 4 projects 
The short-term plan, including Line 4 (West extension), Line 6 (Extension to Chongqing East), Lines 7, 15, 17, 24, 27 and Line 18 (Phase 2) was approved by NDRC. Construction on several lines started in March 2021. In April 2021, Lines 7 and 17 were redesigned from mostly elevated heavy monorails, similar to Lines 2 and 3, to conventional underground Type As metro lines akin to Lines 4, 5, 9 and 10.

See also
 Chongqing Suburban Railway
 List of metro systems
 List of monorail systems

References

Notes

External links

 Chongqing Rail Transit official website  , Google translation
 Chongqing Transport Card Info , Google translation
 UrbanRail.net's page on the Chongqing Rail Transit
 Map
 Photographs of Chongqing Rail Transit

 
Projects established in 1946
2005 establishments in China
Railway lines opened in 2005
Rail transport in Chongqing
Rapid transit in China
Underground rapid transit in China
Monorails in China
Alweg people movers